Kayanja is an Ugandan name that may refer to
Kayanja Muhanga (born 1965), Ugandan military officer
Elly Kayanja (born 1959), Ugandan military officer 
Frederick Kayanja (born 1938), Ugandan physician and academic administrator
Robert Kayanja, Ugandan pastor, author, speaker